Revisited may refer to:

Peter Gabriel Revisited, a Peter Gabriel album
Revisited (Cowboys International album), 2003
Revisited (Ralph McTell album)
Revisited (Tom Lehrer album), 1960
Revisited (Donavon Frankenreiter album),  2010
Revisited (Eartha Kitt album), 1960